Michal Franc (born 2 November 1967) is a Czech fencer. He competed in the team épée event at the 1992 Summer Olympics.

References

External links
 

1967 births
Living people
Czech male épée fencers
Czechoslovak male épée fencers
Olympic fencers of Czechoslovakia
Fencers at the 1992 Summer Olympics
Sportspeople from Karlovy Vary